The PDC World Cup of Darts is a team darts tournament organised by the Professional Darts Corporation, and was one of the three new tournaments introduced into the PDC calendar in 2010. It is broadcast live by Sky Sports. Due to the rescheduling of the Players Championship Finals in the PDC calendar, the second edition was played in Hamburg, Germany in February 2012. In 2015, the event took place the Eissporthalle Frankfurt, where it stayed until returning to Hamburg in 2019 when it moved to the Barclaycard Arena. In 2020, the event was held at the Salzburgarena in Salzburg, Austria, and in 2021, it returned to Germany, this time in the Sparkassen-Arena, Jena, and in 2022, it will return to Frankfurt once more.

The competition succeeded the Jocky Wilson Cup; a one-off international match between England and Scotland held in Glasgow on 5 December 2009. England defeated Scotland by 6 points to 0.

Background
In October 2009, PDC chairman Barry Hearn announced his intention to buy the British Darts Organisation and inject £2 million into amateur darts, but the BDO decided not to accept the offer. In a statement, Hearn stated "The aim of our offer to the BDO was to unify the sport of darts and this remains our long-term objective despite the decision by the BDO County Associations" The Jocky Wilson Cup was held in December. 
 
But following the BDO's rejection, the PDC went on to arrange three brand new tournaments for 2010 to help the development of youth and women's darts: the PDC Under-21 World Championship, the PDC Women's World Championship, and the PDC World Cup of Darts.

Format

In the first 3 competitions (held in 2010, 2012 and 2013), the participating teams were the top 24 countries in the PDC Order of Merit at the end of October after the 2010 World Grand Prix. Each nation's top ranked player was then joined by the second highest player of that country. For seeding, the average rank of both was used.

The top 8 nations automatically started in the second round (last 16). The other 16 nations played in the first round. Matches were best of 11 legs in doubles, and the losing team threw first in the next leg. The winners of the first round played the top eight ranked teams in the second round, also in best of 11 doubles.

In 2010, the winners of the second round were drawn into two groups of four (A & B). Each team played each other once (three matches per team). Each match consisted of two singles and one doubles – all over best of five legs. 1 point was awarded for a singles win, and 2 points for a doubles win, with all points counting towards the overall league table. The top two teams in each group advanced to the semi-finals.

The semi-finals consisted of four singles games and one doubles game (if required) per match – all over best of 11 legs. Again, 1 point was awarded for a singles win, and 2 points for a doubles win. If the match score is 3–3 at the end of the games, then a sudden-death doubles leg would decide who goes through to the final.

The final was the same format as the semi-final, but each game was best of 15 legs.

In 2012, the first round format remained the same, with the exception being that the matches were best of 9 doubles. The second round had games where each match consisted of two singles and one doubles – over best of seven legs in singles, and best of 9 legs in doubles. As before, 1 point was awarded for a singles win, and 2 points for a doubles win. If the score was tied 2–2, then a sudden death doubles leg took place to determine the winner. The format was the same for the quarter-finals, with the exception that the doubles matches were best of 7 legs, like the singles.

In the semi-finals, games had each match consisting of four singles and one doubles match – over best of seven legs. As before, 1 point was awarded for a singles win, and 2 points for a doubles win. If the score was tied 3–3, then a sudden death doubles leg took place to determine the winner. In the final, the match consisted of four singles and one doubles match – over best of 13 legs. As before, 1 point was awarded for a singles win, and 2 points for a doubles win. If the score was tied 3–3, then a sudden death doubles leg took place to determine the winner.

In 2013, a new format was created. The 24 teams were put into groups of 3, which each contained one of the top 8 seeds, plus two other teams. The teams played each other in best of 9 doubles matches, with the top 2 in each group progressing to the last 16. The last 16 also used the same best of 9 doubles format.

In the quarter-finals onwards, the matches began with two best of 7 leg singles matches. If one team won both singles matches, they were declared the winner, if each team won one match each, a best of 7 doubles match would decide the winner. In the final, there would be four best of 7 leg singles matches (if needed), with a point for each win, with a 7 leg doubles decider, if the singles matches ended making the score 2–2.

In 2014 and 2015, the field extended to 32 teams, with the top 16 teams being seeded, and each playing a best of 9 doubles match to begin. After that, the format was the same as the later stages of the previous tournament with two best of 7 leg singles matches. If one team won both singles matches, they were declared the winner, if each team won one match each, a best of 7 doubles match would decide the winner. In the final, there would be four best of 7 leg singles matches (if needed), with a point for each win, with a 7 leg doubles decider, if the singles matches ended making the score 2–2. In 2015, the final was tweaked, so that the doubles match would be the third match.

The format has stayed the same ever since, with the only major change being in 2016, when only the top 8 teams were seeded, rather than the top 16.

In March 2023, the PDC announced a completely revamped format for the following tournament set to happen between 15–18 June 2023. This new format would consist of 40 different nations for the first time in the events history and a group stage for the first time since 2013. 12 groups of 3 countries will be drawn, with the winner of each group advancing into the second round, while the top four ranked countries would automatically advance into the second round. This format also consisted of doubles throughout the competition for the first time.

Results by year

  Phil Taylor and Adrian Lewis won the 2012 title on the sudden death doubles leg.

Records and statistics

Individual appearances
As of the 2022 tournament, only 4 players have played in all 12 editions of the World Cup of Darts.

They are:
 Brendan Dolan
 William O'Connor
 Mensur Suljović
 Simon Whitlock

Total finalist appearances

Country

Team

Player

 Active players are shown in bold
 Only players who reached the final are included
 In the event of identical records, players are sorted in alphabetical order by family name

High averages

Team

Individual

References

External links
 
World Cup of Darts on Darts database

 
Professional Darts Corporation tournaments
PDC
2010 establishments in Germany
Recurring sporting events established in 2010
Annual sporting events